Discontinuity may refer to:
Discontinuity (casting), an interruption in the normal physical structure or configuration of an article
Discontinuity (geotechnical engineering), a plane or surface marking a change in physical or chemical properties in a soil or rock mass
Discontinuity (mathematics), a property of a mathematical function
Discontinuity (linguistics), a property of tree structures in theoretical linguistics
Discontinuity (Postmodernism), a conception of history as espoused by the philosopher Michel Foucault.
Revolutionary breach of legal continuity
A break in continuity (fiction), in literature
Fracture (geology), discontinuity in rocks
Discontinuity (transmission lines), a step in impedance causing reflections